"Winter Wonderland" is a Japanese single by South Korean boy group Shinee. It was released on 21 December 2016. It reached number two on the weekly Oricon Singles Chart with 88,048 copies sold. It also reached third place on the Billboard Japan Hot 100.

Track listing

Chart performance

Oricon

Billboard Japan

References

External links

Shinee songs
2016 singles
J-pop songs
Japanese-language songs
2016 songs
Songs written by Erik Lidbom